PS-126 Karachi Central-IV is a constituency of the Provincial Assembly of Sindh.

General elections 2013

General elections 2018

See also
 PS-125 Karachi Central-III
 PS-127 Karachi Central-V

References

External links
 Election commission Pakistan's official website
 Awazoday.com check result
 Official Website of Government of Sindh

Constituencies of Sindh